The Lamoille Senate District is one of 13 Vermont Senate districts included in the redistricting and reapportionment plan developed by the Vermont General Assembly following the 2010 U.S. Census. The plan applies to legislatures elected in 2012, 2014, 2016, 2018, and 2020.  A new plan will be developed in 2022 following the 2020 U.S. Census.

The Lamoille District includes all of Lamoille County except the town of Wolcott which are in the Essex-Orleans district.

As of the 2010 census, the state as a whole had a population of 625,741. As there are a total of 30 Senators, there were 20,294 residents per senator.  The Lamoille District had a population of 20,625 in that same census.  The district is apportioned one senator. The district's 20,625 residents per senator is 1.63% above the state average.

As of the 2000 census, the state as a whole had a population of 608,827. As there are a total of 30 Senators, there were 20,294 residents per senator.  The Lamoille District had a population of 20,625 in that same census.  The district is apportioned one senator. The district's 20,625 residents per senator is 1.63% above the state average.

District Senator
(As of 2017)

Richard Westman, Republican

Towns and cities in the Lamoille District, 2012–2022 elections

Lamoille County 
Belvidere
Cambridge
Eden
Elmore
Hyde Park
Johnson
Morristown
Stowe
Waterville

Towns and cities in the Lamoille District, 2002–2012 elections

Lamoille County 

 Belvidere
 Cambridge
 Elmore
 Hyde Park
 Johnson
 Morristown
 Stowe
 Waterville

See also 
Vermont Senate districts, 2012–2022

External links

 Redistricting information from Vermont Legislature
 2002 and 2012 Redistricting information from Vermont Legislature
 Map of Vermont Senate districts and statistics (PDF) 2002–2012

Map

Lamoille County, Vermont
Vermont Senate districts